Jean Paul Lanfranchi (born 14 July 1951) is a French lawyer and businessman.

Early life and education

Lanfranchi was raised in Africa until the age of 11 years, then he attended the day school at St. Paul Abidjan in Côte d'Ivoire in Marist Brothers. He learned the languages of the Black African countries: the Lingala, the kigwandi, the Tshiluba and Dioula.

Back in France, he continued his studies at the Stanislas College and the Law University of Paris control until then at the Institute of Higher International Studies at Panthéon-Assas University.

Career 
Lanfranchi became an attorney in 1977 in Kinshasa in Democratic Republic of Congo. He was the first French lawyer practicing in Kinshasa and the advisor of the Embassy of France in Democratic Republic of Congo until 1980. 

Lanfranchi was the friend of the family of President Mobutu Sese Seko and his personal advisor from 1980 until his death. Moreover, he became consultant for major French corporations based in Black Africa as Accor, Dumez, Castel Frères, EMS, Northern France, Air France – UTA. He also organized the privatization of the sugar sector of the Ivory Coast of Gabon and Central African Republic. Lanfranchi helped the restructuration of many state enterprises to the Omar Bongo, second president of the  Gabonese Republic.

He managed the rescue of the Sugar Company of Upper Ogoouénotemment (SOSUHO) to Franceville, capital of Haut-Ogooué province of birth of the President.
He works closely with Patrice Otha, Chapter President of Gabon Initiative Industries Transparency Initiative (EITI) and new Chief of Staff for Ali Bongo since January 2010.

Lanfranchi is in Castel Group advisor to President Pierre Castel. He restructures activities breweries and bottling operations in Africa and Eastern Europe. He managed to regain ownership of breweries in Eastern Europe who had been robbed at Castel Group. In January 2006, Lanfranchi founded the BIH Eastern society that includes all the activities of the breweries and bottling Castel Group in Georgia, Azerbaijan, Armenia, Uzbekistan and Kurdistan.

He became chairman, CEO and shareholder with CVCI (Citi Venture Capital International – the emerging markets private equity arm of Citigroup).

He is recognized as an expert on economic development in this area and has consulted on numerous occasions to share his experience:

– Symposium of the French Senate in the Caucasus

– Participation in the first Eurasia Forum

– Seminar of the French Agency for international business development Ubifrance in Central Asia

– Symposium on Tbilisi, Chamber of Commerce and Industry – French Georgian

References

Further reading
 23 December 2009 – Coliseum / liaison committee for solidarity with Eastern Europe – Georgia businesses relationship with France – Castel Sakartvelo LTD (French Group AFFILIATES, FBC G). Beers, soft drinks and wine distribution. Phillippart Alain Jean Paul Lanfranchi.

External links
 Official website of Castel Group
 Official website of Castel Sakartvelo
  Citibank France
  Embassy of France in Democratic Republic of Congo

20th-century French lawyers
French chief executives
Businesspeople from Paris
University of Paris alumni
1951 births
Living people
Collège Stanislas de Paris alumni
Democratic Republic of the Congo businesspeople